Saint-Georges, often unofficially known as Saint-Georges-de-Champlain, was a former village municipality and is now a sector (secteur) of the city of Shawinigan.

Until 1919, Saint-Georges had been known as Village Turcotte.  It merged with Shawinigan in a municipal amalgamation on January 1, 2002.  In the Canada 1996 Census its population was 3,929.

Mayors
From 1916 to 2001, Saint-Georges had its own mayor and its own city council.  The mayors were:

References

Neighbourhoods in Shawinigan
Former municipalities in Quebec
Former towns in Canada
Populated places disestablished in 2002